Reda Agourram (born October 12, 1990 in Rabat), is a Moroccan born-Canadian former soccer player.

Career

Professional
Agourram began playing soccer with Montreal-Concordia in 2008 in the Ligue de Soccer Elite Quebec. In 2009, he signed with Trois-Rivières Attak of the Canadian Soccer League. In his debut season he was the league's top scorer with 13 goals, and won the CSL Championship. He was also named the CSL Rookie of the Year.

On January 20, 2010 the Montreal Impact of the USSF Division 2 announced that Agourram had been invited to their pre-season training camp. After a successful tryout, the Impact signed him to a two-year contract on March 17, 2010. He made his debut for the team on April 11, 2010, in a 2-0 loss to the Austin Aztex.

After being without a club for a year, it was announced that Agourram was returning to his native Morocco to play for FAR Rabat of the Botola, the top division of the Moroccan football league system.

International
Agourram played for the Canada U-20 team in the 2009 Jeux de la Francophonie. He managed to score in his second game in a 2-2 draw against Congo. He was also invited to the 2010 Canada U-23 camp. In 2013, Agourram was selected for the newly formed Québec national soccer team for its inaugural matches in the 2013 International Peoples, Cultures, and Tribes Tournament.  He scored in a 3-1 group stage victory over Provence.

International goals 
Scores and results list Québec's goal tally first.

Career stats

References

1990 births
Living people
Moroccan footballers
Canadian Soccer League (1998–present) players
Canadian soccer players
Association football forwards
Footballers from Rabat
Soccer people from Quebec
Botola players
Trois-Rivières Attak players
Montreal Impact (1992–2011) players
USSF Division 2 Professional League players
North American Soccer League players
Canada men's youth international soccer players
Canada men's under-23 international soccer players
Moroccan emigrants to Canada
AS FAR (football) players